Khorlan Zhakansha (born 15 June 1992) is a Kazakhstani sport wrestler who competes in the men's Greco Roman category. He claimed silver medal in the men's 55 kg event during the 2019 World Wrestling Championships.

In 2021, he won the silver medal in the 55 kg event at the Matteo Pellicone Ranking Series 2021 held in Rome, Italy.

References

External links 
 

1992 births
Living people
Kazakhstani male sport wrestlers
World Wrestling Championships medalists
Asian Wrestling Championships medalists
21st-century Kazakhstani people